Pablo Sebastián López (born 8 November 1975, Salta) is a member of the Workers' Party (Argentina), and a member of the Argentine national chamber of deputies.

He was elected as a provincial deputy in Salta Province in 2001 and re-elected in 2005, and was replaced by Claudio del Plá in 2009.

He was elected as a national deputy for Salta in the 2013 Argentine legislative election, nominally as a candidate of the Workers' Party, but effectively part of the Workers' Left Front.

He will be the Workers' Party's candidate for mayor of Salta city at the next election.

References

External links 
blog (Spanish)
Argenpress article (Spanish)
El Intransigente article (Spanish)

Living people
Workers' Party (Argentina) politicians
People from Salta
Members of the Argentine Chamber of Deputies elected in Salta
1975 births